"Fake & True" is a song recorded by South Korean girl group Twice. It was released by Warner Music Japan on October 18, 2019, as the title track from their second Japanese studio album &Twice.

Background and release
The song was pre-released as a digital single on October 18, 2019, along with its accompanying music video, and was officially released on November 19 by Warner Music Japan as the title track from &Twice.

Composition
"Fake & True" was composed by Kass with lyrics written by Jam9. It was described as a retro-feeling synth-pop song that incorporates vibrant brass and deep-house elements and it's "meant to focus on the idea of being truthful to oneself in the pursuit of success and goals, rather than accepting the falsity of settling".

Music video
On October 18, 2019, the song's music video was released on YouTube. It was directed by production team Vikings League (Vishop).

The music video focused on the group's glamour and fashion sense, with the girls wearing high fashion outfits throughout the video. Visual effects of mirrors, virtual reality goggles, masks, glitchy realities, cameras, and video screens, as well as a prominent lie detector were used throughout the music video to make the viewer question what is "Fake & True". To reinforce the themes, classical art and the biblical story of Adam and Eve also appeared.

A new version of the "Fake & True" music video called "The Truth Game" was released on February 5, 2020, that is only available on the DVD of the &Twice repackage album. It is a re-edited version of the original video, featuring more close up shots and lie detector scenes and fewer clips of the choreography.

Promotion
"Fake & True" was first performed during Twice World Tour 2019–2020 "Twicelights"'s Japanese leg, which began on October 23, 2019, in Sapporo. The single was also performed on Music Station on Music Station 2 Hour Special episode on November 22, 2019.

Charts

References

2019 singles
2019 songs
J-pop songs
Japanese-language songs
Twice (group) songs